First String is the debut album by American jazz group the String Trio of New York recorded in 1979 for the Italian Black Saint label.

Reception
The Allmusic review by Scott Yanow awarded the album 4 stars stating "the music expertly blends composition with improvisation. This music (free at times but always going in a logical direction) grows in interest with each listen".

Track listing
 "The East Side Suite" (John Lindberg) - 19:55
 "Subway Ride With Giuseppi Logan" (Billy Bang) - 8:00
 "Catharsis in Real Time" (James Emery) - 9:03
Recorded at Barigozzi Studio in Milano, Italy in June 1979

Personnel
Billy Bang - violin
James Emery - guitar
John Lindberg - bass

References

Black Saint/Soul Note albums
String Trio of New York albums
1979 albums